Briggs Sports F.C. was an English association football club based in Doncaster, South Yorkshire. They competed in the Yorkshire Football League and FA Amateur Cup.

History

League and cup history

References

Defunct football clubs in England
Defunct football clubs in South Yorkshire
Yorkshire Football League
Sheffield Association League
Doncaster & District Senior League
Works association football teams in England